Samoš (Serbian Cyrillic: Самош) is a village in Serbia. It is situated in the Kovačica municipality, in the South Banat District, Vojvodina province. The village has a Serb ethnic majority (89.73%) and its population numbering 1,247 people (2002 census).

Name
In Serbian the village is known as Samoš (Самош), in Hungarian as Számos, in Romanian as Samoș, and in German as Samosch.

Historical population

1961: 2,310
1971: 2,108
1981: 1,658
1991: 1,438

References
Slobodan Ćurčić, Broj stanovnika Vojvodine, Novi Sad, 1996.

See also
List of places in Serbia
List of cities, towns and villages in Vojvodina

Populated places in Serbian Banat
Populated places in South Banat District
Kovačica